HNoMS Bergen was a  destroyer built for the Royal Navy as HMS Cromwell. She was built by Scotts of Greenock between 1944 and 1946 and initially was to have been called Cretan. She was sold to the Royal Norwegian Navy in 1946 and renamed Bergen. She was scrapped in 1967.

Operational service
Commissioned too late for service in the Second World War, following sale her pennant number was changed to D304. She was one of four Cr-class destroyers sold to Norway. Unlike many other destroyers of this class, none of the Norwegian ships received any significant upgrades during their operational service.

On the night of 1 November 1965, five crewmen were lost overboard in a gale while Bergen was off Malin Head, Donegal. An extensive search by  Bergen and another Norwegian ship, as well as the Portrush lifeboat and the British survey ship , found one empty life-raft but no sign of the crew.

Bergen continued to serve in the Royal Norwegian Navy until scrapped in 1967.

References

Publications
 
 
 
 

 

1945 ships
Ships built on the River Clyde
C-class destroyers (1943) of the Royal Navy
Destroyers of the Royal Norwegian Navy